Gem State Adventist Academy or just Gem State Academy is a private, Seventh-day Adventist high school located in Caldwell, Idaho.  Gem State Adventist Academy is a part of the Seventh-day Adventist education system, the world's second largest Christian school system.

History
The Seventh-day Adventist Church, established in 1863, in the early twentieth century started to establish religious schools. The schools were to be built in rural locations and emphasis was to be placed upon physical labor as well as academic work.

In Idaho, this resulted in building Gem State Academy during the summer of 1918. The site chosen was in Caldwell, a thriving little city of about 5000 people, one half-hour from the capital city, Boise. Seventeen acres of semi-rural land was purchased at the intersection of Linden Street and Indiana Avenue in Caldwell. The land was chosen because it was easily accessible by rail and because its soil was fertile and easily irrigated. The plan was to develop a farm where students could be employed to help pay their tuition.

Besides the usual school subjects, the students were taught practical skills such as woodworking, first aid, sewing, cooking, mechanics and farming. They also pursued religious studies and engaged in many service projects where they acquired practical experience in serving people in need. That fall, 1918, 30 students enrolled. The new school thrived and grew during its first decade and by the spring of 1930 enrollment had climbed to above 100.

During the Great Depression of the 1930s even the small tuition fee of $21.45 per month became more than most parents could afford. Some paid entrance fees with a horse or a cow or a load of beans or apples. The principal, W.S. Boynton, took steps to create more student employment opportunities. A greenhouse and truck garden was begun in 1931. The students raised vegetables to sell door-to-door and commercially. Large quantities of celery and carrots were shipped by railway freight to be sold in other areas. Much of the food for the students came from those gardens as well. In 1932, a cannery was begun in the basement of the church elementary school on the property. Fruits and vegetables were canned for use at the school, custom canning was done for area residents, and surplus corn and other vegetables were canned in large quantities and sold or bartered to local merchants. Campus wages in the early 1930s were 12 cents an hour for boys and 10 cents an hour for girls.

At Gem State, the 1941 and 1942 yearbooks were dedicated to those students and former students who had gone to serve in the war, some of whom had been killed in action.

Postwar years

After the war a bakery was built to increase student employment opportunities; it ultimately became the Rhodes Bake-N-Serv Company.

In the 1960s, the Idaho Conference of Seventh-day Adventists developed plans for a new campus for the aging and outgrown Gem State, further from the expanding city. It was voted that a new school should be built in a more rural area. The land chosen had been bought in previous years, in the country on top of a hill overlooking the Boise Valley. By the fall of 1962, the administration building, dormitories, power plant and laundry were complete enough to start school.

The primary focus of a faith-based education with real life work training did not change. Over 93% of students went on to college after graduation.

Accreditation
All teachers are certified through the State of Idaho and the North Pacific Union Conference of Seventh-Day Adventist. Gem State's curriculum complies with State of Idaho and the North Pacific Union Conference of Seventh-Day Adventist standards for curriculum.
Gem State Adventist Academy is accredited the 
Northwest Accreditation Commission, the Accrediting Association of Seventh-Day Adventist Schools, Colleges and Universities, Inc.
and the National Council for Private School Accreditation.

Academics
The required curriculum includes classes in the following subject areas: Religion, English, Oral Communications, Social Studies, Mathematics, Science, Physical Education, Health, Computer Applications, Fine Arts, and Electives. Over 90% of Gem State students go on to college many to Walla Walla University.

Spiritual aspects
All students take religion classes each year that they are enrolled. These classes cover topics in biblical history and Christian and denominational doctrines. Instructors in other disciplines also begin each class period with prayer or a short devotional thought, many which encourage student input. Weekly, the entire student body gathers together in the auditorium for an hour-long chapel service. As well there is a daily 20 minute chapel.
Outside the classrooms there is year-round spiritually oriented programming that relies on student involvement.

Athletics
The Academy offers the following varsity competitive sports
Basketball (boys & girls)
Volleyball (girls)
Flag Football  (boys)

In addition, the school sponsors a Basketball team called The GSAA Jaguars.

See also

 List of Seventh-day Adventist secondary and elementary schools
 List of Seventh-day Adventist colleges and universities
 List of Seventh-day Adventist hospitals
 List of Seventh-day Adventist medical schools
 List of Seventh-day Adventist secondary schools
 Seventh-day Adventist education
 Seventh-day Adventist Church
 Seventh-day Adventist theology
 History of the Seventh-day Adventist Church
 Seventh-day Adventist Church

References

External links

Private high schools in Idaho
Adventist secondary schools in the United States
Schools in Canyon County, Idaho
Caldwell, Idaho
1918 establishments in Idaho
Educational institutions established in 1918